Sandadas Coperahewa (born 1923)  is a Sinhala writer, poet, scholar, art critic, teacher and journalist in Sri Lanka.

Coperhewa was born in Pamburana and educated at Pamburana Sariyuth College. He attended  St. Thomas' College, Matara from the age of 9.
He was recruited by Warden R.S.de Saram and taught Sinhala, Art and Buddhism for thirty two years (1951 -1983)  at S. Thomas' College, Mt Lavinia alongside Arisen Ahubudu, GL Jinadasa and D.S. Jayasekera.

He contributed poems to Subasa - journal started by Munidasa Cumaratunga in 1941 and became an active member of the Hela Havula organization. He was deputy leader of the Hela Havula,  an editor of the Pali Dictionary published by "Siri Vajiranana Bhikku Center Maharagama" and Editorial Consultant of Little Star Children’s weekly and Lankadeepa. He wrote columns on issues of Art, Buddhism, Sinhala Language and Literature in the English broadsheets, and translated Prof R.H.Wilenskis Miniature History of European Art to Sinhala ( Uropa Kala Itihasaya ha Uropa kala Hela Kala Sasandua Colombo: M.D. Gunasena, 1958). He also wrote a commentary to Sinhala poem Daham Gaeta Mala Vivaranaya.

Honours
The "Hela Havula Movement" awarded him the title "Hela Bas Mini" 1993 in recognition of his services to Sinhala Language and the Department of Cultural Affairs awarded him the title the "Kala-Bhushana" in 2003 and "Divaman Pranama" by Godage Literary Festival in 2015 in recognition of his services to Art, Literature and Sinhala language.

References

Hela Havula
Sinhalese writers
Sri Lankan poets
Sinhala-language poets
Sri Lankan novelists
Sinhalese academics
Sri Lankan lyricists
20th-century Sri Lankan historians
Alumni of St. Thomas' College, Matara
1923 births
Living people
People associated with S. Thomas' College, Mount Lavinia
People from Matara, Sri Lanka